The CAB Jubilee Tournament, also known as Hero Cup for sponsorship reasons, was a cricket tournament played in India in 1993 to commemorate the Cricket Association of Bengal's diamond jubilee. India, Sri Lanka, West Indies, South Africa and Zimbabwe took part in the multi-nation tournament. Envisaged as a six-nation tournament Pakistan pulled out on 3 November, four days before the commencement of the first game. India beat West Indies in the final of the tournament to win the Hero Cup. Hero Cup was the first cricket event to be sponsored by Hero Honda.

Squads

South Africa announced a squad that would play the Hero Cup and the Australia tour retaining Kepler Wessels as their captain. Bowler Brett Schultz was rested owing to an injury. Ahead of the tournament, the India squad participated in a preparatory camp starting 1 November at the National Stadium in Delhi. The 18-member Zimbabwe squad arrived in Dhaka the same day to play two limited over games against Bangladesh Cricket Control Board XI, the latter then an associate member of the International Cricket Council.

Notable efforts
Notable cricketing contributions include Sachin Tendulkar's match winning last over for India against South Africa in the Semi-finals (also the first match under lights at the Eden Gardens), Anil Kumbles 6/12 for India against the West Indies in the final – a match winning effort and then the best bowling figures by an Indian in limited overs cricket, Sanath Jayasuriya opening the batting for the first time for Sri Lanka and Jonty Rhodes's world record five catches for South Africa against the West Indies.

Winning team 
India won the tournament beating the West Indies.

Controversies
Two of the matches involved crowd trouble, first in Ahmedabad, where crowd trouble interrupted play and in Calcutta, where a firecracker exploded in West Indian Keith Arthurtons face.

Hero Cup was the first tournament to be broadcast live on a satellite channel, Star TV. Until the Hero Cup in 1993, state terrestrial broadcaster Doordarshan had a monopoly on broadcast of cricket matches in India. Doordarshan claimed violation of the Indian Telegraph Act, 1885 act, claiming the broadcast right was public property and had to be uplinked from India (Star TV uplinks from Hong Kong). The matter went up to the Supreme Court in 1995, which held that broadcast rights could not be treated as public property.

Fixtures

Venues
Ten different venues were used for each of the ten league games, with the semi-finals and finals being held at Calcutta.

Points table
Points table at the end of the league stage:

League matches

Semi-finals

Final

References

External links
 Tournament home at ESPN Cricinfo
 

1993 in Indian cricket
International cricket competitions from 1991–92 to 1994
Cricket
Hero Honda motorcycles
Hero Group